Polycelis is a genus of planarians in the family Planariidae. The genus was described in 1831 by Christian Gottfried Ehrenberg and currently has no consensus on the exact number of species.

Species
The following species are recognised in the genus Polycelis:
 Polycelis aurantiacus
 Polycelis benazzii
 Polycelis bilinearis
 Polycelis borelli
 Polycelis borellii
 Polycelis brunnea
 Polycelis catulus
 Polycelis cormita
 Polycelis coronata
 Polycelis ebernea
 Polycelis eburnea
 Polycelis elegans
 Polycelis elongata
 Polycelis eudendrocoeloides
 Polycelis eurantron
 Polycelis fallax
 Polycelis felina
 Polycelis gracilis
 Polycelis hepta
 Polycelis hepta a
 Polycelis jinglensis
 Polycelis jingyuanica
 Polycelis kashmirica
 Polycelis koslowi
 Polycelis kulsaika
 Polycelis lactea
 Polycelis lhunzhubica
 Polycelis lineoliger
 Polycelis linkoi
 Polycelis nigra
 Polycelis nigro-fusca
 Polycelis nyingchica
 Polycelis oculimarginata
 Polycelis pallida
 Polycelis pamirensis
 Polycelis panniculatus
 Polycelis pathan
 Polycelis polychroa
 Polycelis polyopis
 Polycelis pulla
 Polycelis receptaculosa
 Polycelis relicta
 Polycelis roseimaculatus
 Polycelis sapporo
 Polycelis schmidti
 Polycelis schulmanii
 Polycelis sierrensis
 Polycelis sinensis
 Polycelis stummeri
 Polycelis surantion
 Polycelis tasmanica
 Polycelis tenuis
 Polycelis tibetica
 Polycelis tothi
 Polycelis vaginuloides
 Polycelis variabilis
 Polycelis wutaishanica
 Polycelis xigazensis

References

Tricladida